Ivano Camozzi (born 12 April 1962) is an Italian former alpine skier who competed in the 1988 Winter Olympics. He came 4th in the Giant Slalom event, won by compatriot Alberto Tomba.

He was married to former alpine skier Michela Figini.

References

External links
 

1962 births
Living people
Italian male alpine skiers
Olympic alpine skiers of Italy
Alpine skiers at the 1988 Winter Olympics